Roland Csaba Niczuly (born 21 September 1995) is a Romanian professional footballer who plays as a goalkeeper for Liga I club Sepsi OSK, which he captains.

Career
A youth product of KSE Târgu Secuiesc and Universitatea Cluj, Niczuly was sent out on loan by the latter to Unirea Tărlungeni for the 2014–15 season. He made his senior debut on 30 August 2014, aged 19, in a 2–1 Liga II win over Olt Slatina. Niczuly was an undisputed starter during his stint in Brașov County, with the club finishing fourth in its series.

After his loan deal expired, Niczuly totalled 19 appearances in all competitions for Universitatea Cluj in the 2015–16 campaign. In the summer of 2016, he moved to Sepsi OSK, which immediately gained promotion to the Liga I by finishing second in the league. He went on to record his debut in the top tier on 16 July 2017, in a 0–1 loss to Astra Giurgiu.

On 22 July 2020, Niczuly was a starter in the 0–1 loss to FCSB in the Cupa României final. Two years later, he again played a final, this time a 2–1 victory over Voluntari.

Personal life
Born in Târgu Secuiesc, Niczuly is of Hungarian ethnicity. In 2019, he married his partner Tania Alexia, a native of Cluj-Napoca with whom he has a son.

Career statistics

Club

Honours
Sepsi OSK
Cupa României: 2021–22; runner-up: 2019–20
Supercupa României: 2022

References

External links

Roland Niczuly at Liga Profesionistă de Fotbal 

1995 births
Living people
People from Târgu Secuiesc
Romanian footballers
Romanian people of Hungarian descent
Romanian sportspeople of Hungarian descent
Association football goalkeepers
Liga I players
Liga II players
FC Universitatea Cluj players
CS Unirea Tărlungeni players
Sepsi OSK Sfântu Gheorghe players